Granozzo con Monticello is a comune (municipality) in the Province of Novara in the Italian region Piedmont, located about  northeast of Turin and about  southwest of Novara.

References

Cities and towns in Piedmont